Beaudesert–Boonah–Fassifern Road is a non-continuous  road route in the Scenic Rim region of Queensland, Australia.  It has two official names, Beaudesert–Boonah Road and Boonah–Fassifern Road. The route is signed as State Route 90. These roads are joined by a  section of Ipswich-Boonah Road (State Route 93). Beaudesert–Boonah Road (number 212) is a state-controlled regional road, and Boonah–Fassifern Road (number 214) is also a state-controlled regional road. As part of State Route 90 it provides an alternate route between the Cunningham Highway and the Gold Coast.

Route Description
It runs generally west, crossing the Logan River into .

Ipswich–Boonah Road ends at a three-way roundabout intersection in Boonah. State Route 93 continues south as Boonah–Rathdowney Road, and State Route 90 turns west as Boonah–Fassifern Road. From here the road passes through good farming land, much of it irrigated.

State Route 90
It is not necessarily the best or the shortest or the quickest route between the two terminii. It was proclaimed as a State Route because, at the time, it was the most convenient route for many users. It is also an example of why motorists in unfamiliar territory should follow a designated route rather than rely on a vehicle navigation system, which may direct them onto less suitable alternative roads.

The route follows Boonah–Fassifern Road east from Fassifern to Boonah, where it turns north-east on Ipswich–Boonah Road. It follows this to Coulson, where it turns east on Beaudesert–Boonah Road. This leads to Beaudesert, where it turns north-east on Mount Lindesay Highway to Beaudesert–Nerang Road, where it turns south-east. This leads into Nerang–Broadbeach Road, which it follows to Broadbeach.

Road condition
The road is fully sealed. Boonah–Fassifern Road has about  greater than 5%.

History

Beaudesert pastoral run was established as a sheep station about 1842, and Bromelton run was settled in the same year. The first school in Bromelton opened in 1880, indicating an increase in population resulting from closer settlement.

Wyaralong was divided between the former shires of Boonah and Beaudesert. Adjoining properties on either side of the shire boundary were settled in 1874 and 1875. A marriage in 1890 brought the two properties under one ownership. The Overflow, as it was named, spanned  at its peak. It is still a substantial property, known as "The Overflow 1895".

The first school in Coulson, then known as Teviotville, opened in 1881, also indicating closer settlement.

The first pastoral run in the Boonah district was taken up in 1844. From 1868 the large pastoral runs were subdivided and the settlement that became Boonah grew rapidly as new settlers moved in. Land was cleared and farms established in several areas around Boonah. To the east this development went as far as the eastern boundary of the Fassifern pastoral run. Part of this development included a road to service the farms. The first creamery in Boonah was built about 1894.

The Fassifern pastoral run was established in 1846. In 1877,  of land was resumed from Fassifern to establish smaller farms. The first school in the Fassifern area was opened in 1879. Templin was settled by German immigrants in the late 1800s. By 1890 sufficient development of small farms had occurred between Fassifern and Boonah that a new town was established. This became the town of Kalbar.

Early roads were cut to enable wheeled vehicle access to the pastoral runs and large freehold properties. As smaller farms were developed the roads were improved and extended until the major commercial centres were linked.

When the Wyaralong Dam was built in 2010 part of the Beaudesert–Boonah Road was realigned and raised. One section runs along an embankment beside the lake.

Major intersections
All distances are from Google Maps. The entire road is in the Scenic Rim local government area.

See also

 List of road routes in Queensland
 List of numbered roads in Queensland

Notes

References

Roads in Queensland